The 1985 NCAA Division I Women's Lacrosse Championship was the fourth annual single-elimination tournament to determine the national championship of Division I NCAA women's college lacrosse. The championship game was played at Franklin Field in Philadelphia, Pennsylvania during May 1985.

The New Hampshire Wildcats won their first championship by defeating the Maryland Terrapins in the final, 6–5. 

The leading scorer for the tournament was Anysia Fedec, from Maryland, with 8 goals. The Most Outstanding Player trophy would not be awarded again until 1998.

Qualification
With the addition of the NCAA Division III Women's Lacrosse Championship this year, only NCAA Division I women's lacrosse programs were eligible for this championship. In turn, only 4 teams contested this tournament, a decrease from the 12 teams who participated each of the previous two years.

Tournament bracket

Tournament outstanding players 
Karen Trudel, Maryland
Trudy Stumpf, Maryland
Sandy Vander-Heyden, New Hampshire

See also 
 NCAA Division I Women's Lacrosse Championship
 NCAA Division III Women's Lacrosse Championship
 1985 NCAA Division I Men's Lacrosse Championship

References

NCAA Division I Women's Lacrosse Championship
NCAA Division I Women's Lacrosse Championship
NCAA Women's Lacrosse Championship
NCAA Division I Women's Lacrosse Championship
Lacrosse in Pennsylvania